Oxyini is one of two tribes of grasshoppers in the subfamily Oxyinae.  Some genera previously listed here are now placed in the subfamilies Caryandinae and Hemiacridinae.

Genera
The Orthoptera Species File includes:

References 

Oxyinae
Orthoptera tribes
Taxa named by Carl Brunner von Wattenwyl